Olivia Howard Dunbar (1873–1953) was an American short story writer, journalist and biographer, best known today for her ghost fiction.

Life 
Dunbar was born in West Bridgewater, Massachusetts in 1873. She graduated from Smith College, after which she worked in newspaper journalism. She worked for The New York World during which time she penned an exposé on Mary Baker Eddy and Christian Science. As a short story writer and critic, she was published in many of the popular periodicals of her time, including Harper's and The Dial. Dunbar wrote several ghost stories, as well as a 1905 essay, "The Decay of the Ghost in Fiction", defending the subgenre. Dunbar was active in the women's suffrage movement, and her work has been noted to contain feminist themes. She married the poet Ridgely Torrence in 1914. Dunbar died in 1953. Her work has been anthologized by Dorothy Scarborough and Jessica Amanda Salmonson.

Selected works

Short fiction 
 The Shell of Sense (1908) 
 The Long Chamber (1914)

Novels 
 A House in Chicago (1947)

References

Further reading 
 The Shell of Sense: Collected Ghost Stories of Olivia Howard Dunbar (1997) edited by Jessica Amanda Salmonson
 What Did Miss Darrington See? (1989) edited by Jessica Amanda Salmonson
 The Supernatural in Modern English Fiction (1917) by Dorothy Scarborough;  available in its entirety at Google Book Search

External links 
 
 
 Olivia Howard Dunbar on eBooks at the University of Adelaide 
 Olivia Howard Dunbar on Harper's Magazine's online archive

Smith College alumni
1873 births
1953 deaths
20th-century American writers
American feminists
Ghost story writers
20th-century American women writers